Lamberto da Cingoli was an inquisitor in 14th century Italy. He is known for suspending Cecco d'Ascoli from a professorship of medicine at the University of Bologna in  1324. Sentence against d'Ascoli was pronounced on October 16, 1324. Lamberto da Cingoli was a Dominican friar.

References

Inquisitors
14th-century Italian Christian monks
Italian Dominicans